A. nivalis may refer to:

 Amanita nivalis, a toxic mushroom species in the genus Amanita
 Andreaea nivalis, a moss species in the genus Andreaea